The 2003 WDF World Cup was the 14th edition of the WDF World Cup darts tournament, organised by the World Darts Federation. It was held in Épinal, France.

Men's singles

Women's singles

Other Winners

Final Points Tables

Men

Women

Youth

References

External links
 Results for 2003 World Cup

WDF World Cup darts
2003
WDF World Cup